Sérgio Ferro (born 25 July 1938) is a Brazilian painter, architect and professor.

Ferro was born in Curitiba, Paraná.  He graduated from the University of São Paulo with a degree in architecture in 1962 and completed his post-graduate studies in 1965. Exiled for political reasons from his own country for 30 years, Ferro taught at the Grenoble School of Architecture from 1982 to 1997.

He resides with his wife, Ediane, in São Paulo, Brazil, and Grignan, France.

Sérgio Ferro's paintings can be found in museums worldwide, especially in Brazil and France.

References

Brazilian painters
1938 births
Living people
Brazilian architects
People from Curitiba
Brazilian expatriates in France